C-C motif chemokine 4-like is a protein that in humans is encoded by the CCL4L1 gene.

Function 

This gene is one of several cytokine genes clustered on the q-arm of chromosome 17. Cytokines are a family of secreted proteins involved in immunoregulatory and inflammatory processes. This protein is similar to CCL4 which inhibits HIV entry by binding to the cellular receptor CCR5. The copy number of this gene varies among individuals; most individuals have 1-5 copies in the diploid genome, although rare individuals do not contain this gene at all. The human genome reference assembly contains two copies of this gene. This record represents the more centromeric gene.

References

External links

Further reading